Nueva is the Spanish feminine form of the word for "new" and may refer to:

 Isla Nueva, an uninhabited island in Chile
 The Nueva School, a school in Hillsborough, California, USA.
 Nueva (Llanes), a parish in Llanes, Asturias, Spain